The Geneva Golden Tornadoes football program is a college football team that represents Geneva College in the Presidents' Athletic Conference, a part of the NCAA Division III. The team has had 29 head coaches since its first recorded football game in 1890.

Among the coaches in the history at Geneva College include College Football Hall of Fame members Bo McMillin and Cal Hubbard.

The current coach is Geno DeMarco who first took the position for the 1993 season. He leads the list with the most games coached and the most total wins. Samuel G. Craig has the highest winning percentage of the coaches at .859, accumulated from 1900 through the 1903 seasons and a total of 32 games. Arthur McKean managed the most tie games with 7.

Key

Coaches

Details
The following are details on coaches that do not have articles.  For coaches with articles on Wikipedia, see links in the table above.

Archibald Leech

Dr. Archibald W. Leech played football, basketball, and baseball at Geneva College.  He was known for his athletic skills and was named "one of the most noted athletes ever graduated" from the school.  The school suffered one of its largest defeats to Penn State by a score of 73 to 0.  This game was also Penn State's ninth largest all-time margin of victory and total points scored.

Leech only coached football for one year at Geneva, but stayed on as a full professor at the college.  Leech gained prominence as an educator and businessman in the area of Cambria County, Pennsylvania where he also served as postmaster.

Graydon Long

Graydon Long (March 11, 1889-September 1966) was a professional football officials in the early days of the sport, officiating games of teams that would later make up the National Football League.

Sports history

Playing history
Long played high school football at West high School in Rochester, New York as a member of the class of 1908.  The 1906 team concluded an undefeated season and the 1907 team produced solid results as well.

Officiating
After coaching in the college ranks, Long worked as an official for professional football at the time, primarily working games for the future NFL team Rochester Jeffersons.

Joe Banks

Coach Joseph "Joe" Banks (September 8, 1919 – June 19, 2007) was a long-time college athletics figure in Ohio and Pennsylvania.  He worked as a head coach for American football and track & field.

Coaching

Geneva College
Banks was the 24th head coach at Geneva for two seasons, from 1967 until 1968.  His one victory came in the last game of the 1967 season against Bridgewater College by a score of 30 to 13.

Ohio Northern
Prior to taking the position at Geneva, he was the head track coach and assistant football coach at Ohio Northern University in Ada, Ohio from 1960 until 1967. where he completed a "turnaround season" in 1962.  After coaching at Geneva and a brief stint at a high school, he would return to Ohio Northern in 1971 for the remainder of his career, where he retired in 2002 as an admissions counselor.  He has been credited with recruiting more students than any other person to Ohio Northern.

While at Ohio Northern, Banks would regularly hold training sessions for high school athletic administrators on how to run and promote track and field meets as well as how to coach individual events.

Ohio Northern honored his contribution to the university by naming their home track meet the "Joe Banks Invitational."

Military service
Banks served in the United States military during World War II as a Sergeant with the Third Army's 965th Ordnance Heavy Automotive Maintenance company in the Rhineland (Battle of the Bulge) and the Asiatic-Pacific Theatre in the Philippines.

Personal life
Banks earned a Bachelor of Science in education and later a Bachelor of Arts from Ohio Northern University.  He later completed a Master of Education from Kent State University.  He graduated from high school at New Philadelphia in 1937 where he was coached at track & field by Woody Hayes.

Dan Frasier
Daniel M. Frasier was named NAIA District 18 Coach of the Year in 1971.  Frasier engineered a turnaround of the program, when the football team went to what was considered a "laughing stock of the district" to an 8-0 start in 1971 (some records show a 7-0 start and losing the last two games).

Before being head football coach at Geneva, he was assistant football coach at Geneva under Donald Lederick while simultaneously acting as the head baseball coach.  He also played minor league baseball for the Houston Astros farm team.

Upon retirement from college coaching, he entered the private sector and took a career in banking.

Notes

References

Geneva

Pennsylvania sports-related lists